The Arab Youth Volleyball Championship is a sport competition for national teams with players under 19 years, currently held biannually and organized by the Arab Volleyball Association.

Results

Summary

Medal table

Participating nations

External links
 Official AVA website

 
International volleyball competitions
Youth volleyball
Volleyball in the Arab world